The men's 800 metres event at the 2014 World Junior Championships in Athletics was held in Eugene, Oregon, USA, at Hayward Field on 25, 26 and 27 July.

Medalists

Records

Results

Final
27 July
Start time: 16:13  Temperature: 29 °C  Humidity: 35 %

Intermediate times:
400m: 49.42 Alfred Kipketer

Semifinals
26 July
First 2 in each heat (Q) and the next 2 fastest (q) advance to the Final

Summary

Details
First 2 in each heat (Q) and the next 2 fastest (q) advance to the Final

Semifinal 1
27 July
Start time: 16:21  Temperature: 31 °C  Humidity: 27%

Intermediate times:
400m: 54.36 Alfred Kipketer

Semifinal 2
27 July
Start time: 16:30  Temperature: 31 °C  Humidity: 27%

Intermediate times:
400m: 53.94 Joshua Tiampati Masikonde

Semifinal 3
27 July
Start time: 16:38  Temperature: 31 °C  Humidity: 27%

Intermediate times:
400m: 53.86 Tre'tez Kinnaird

Heats
25 July
First 3 in each heat (Q) and the next 6 fastest (q) advance to the Semi-Finals

Summary

Details
First 3 in each heat (Q) and the next 6 fastest (q) advance to the Semi-Finals

Heat 1
27 July
Start time: 12:48  Temperature: 22 °C  Humidity: 50%

Note:
IAAF Rule 163.3(a) - Lane infringement

Intermediate times:
400m: 57.26 Kalle Berglund

Heat 2
27 July
Start time: 12:55  Temperature: 22 °C  Humidity: 50%

Intermediate times:
400m: 55.17 Andreas Almgren

Heat 3
27 July
Start time: 13:01  Temperature: 22 °C  Humidity: 50%

Intermediate times:
400m: 54.79 Alfred Kipketer

Heat 4
27 July
Start time: 13:07  Temperature: 22 °C  Humidity: 50%

Intermediate times:
400m: 54.31 Jena Umar

Heat 5
27 July
Start time: 13:13  Temperature: 24 °C  Humidity: 41%

Intermediate times:
400m: 53.24 Joshua Tiampati Masikonde

Heat 6
27 July
Start time: 13:18  Temperature: 24 °C  Humidity: 41%

Intermediate times:
400m: 52.07 Robert Tully

Participation
According to an unofficial count, 48 athletes from 33 countries participated in the event.

References

External links
 WJC14 800 metres schedule

800 metres
800 metres at the World Athletics U20 Championships